This is a list of computing and IT acronyms, initialisms and abbreviations.

0–9 

 1GL—First-Generation Programming Language
 1NF—First Normal Form
 10B2—10BASE-2
 10B5—10BASE-5
 10B-F—10BASE-F
 10B-FB—10BASE-FB
 10B-FL—10BASE-FL
 10B-FP—10BASE-FP
 10B-T—10BASE-T
 100B-FX—100BASE-FX
 100B-TX—100BASE-TX
 100BVG—100BASE-VG
 286—Intel 80286 processor
 2B1Q—2 Binary 1 Quaternary
 2FA—Two-factor authentication
 2GL—Second-Generation Programming Language
 2NF—Second Normal Form
 3GL—Third-Generation Programming Language
 3GPP—3rd Generation Partnership Project-'3G comms
 3GPP2—3rd Generation Partnership Project 2
 3NF—Third Normal Form
 386—Intel 80386 processor
 486—Intel 80486 processor
 4B5BLF—4 Byte 5 Byte Local Fiber
 4GL—Fourth-Generation Programming Language
 4NF—Fourth Normal Form
 5GL—Fifth-Generation Programming Language
 5NF—Fifth Normal Form
 6NF—Sixth Normal Form
 8B10BLF—8 Byte 10 Byte Local Fiber
 802.11—Wireless LAN

A 

 AAA—Authentication Authorization, Accounting
 AABB—Axis Aligned Bounding Box
 AAC—Advanced Audio Coding
 AAL—ATM Adaptation Layer
 AALC—ATM Adaptation Layer Connection
 AARP—AppleTalk Address Resolution Protocol
 ABAC—Attribute-Based Access Control
 ABCL—Actor-Based Concurrent Language
 ABI—Application Binary Interface
 ABM—Asynchronous Balanced Mode
 ABR—Area Border Router
 ABR—Auto Baud-Rate detection
 ABR—Available Bitrate
 ABR—Average Bitrate
 AC—Acoustic Coupler
 AC—Alternating Current
 ACD—Automatic Call Distributor
 ACE—Advanced Computing Environment
 ACID—Atomicity Consistency Isolation Durability
 ACK—ACKnowledgement
 ACK—Amsterdam Compiler Kit
 ACL—Access Control List
 ACL—Active Current Loop
 ACM—Association for Computing Machinery
 ACME—Automated Classification of Medical Entities
 ACP—Airline Control Program
 ACPI—Advanced Configuration and Power Interface
 ACR—Allowed Cell Rate
 ACR—Attenuation to Crosstalk Ratio
 AD—Active Directory
 AD—Administrative Domain
 ADC—Analog-to-Digital Converter
 ADC—Apple Display Connector
 ADB—Apple Desktop Bus
 ADCCP—Advanced Data Communications Control Procedures
 ADO—ActiveX Data Objects
 ADSL—Asymmetric Digital Subscriber Line
 ADT—Abstract Data Type
 AE—Adaptive Equalizer
 AES—Advanced Encryption Standard
 AF—Anisotropic Filtering
 AFP—Apple Filing Protocol
 AGP—Accelerated Graphics Port
 AH—Active Hub
 AI—Artificial Intelligence
 AIX—Advanced Interactive eXecutive
 Ajax—Asynchronous JavaScript and XML
 AL—Active Link
 AL—Access List
 ALAC—Apple Lossless Audio Codec
 ALGOL—Algorithmic Language
 ALSA—Advanced Linux Sound Architecture
 ALU—Arithmetic and Logical Unit
 AM—Access Method
 AM—Active Matrix
 AMOLED—Active-Matrix Organic Light-Emitting Diode
 AM—Active Monitor
 AM—Allied Mastercomputer
 AM—Amplitude Modulation
 AMD—Advanced Micro Devices
 AMQP—Advanced Message Queuing Protocol
 AMR—Audio Modem Riser
 ANN—Artificial Neural Network
 ANSI—American National Standards Institute
 ANT—Another Neat Tool
 AoE—ATA over Ethernet
 AOP—Aspect-Oriented Programming
 APCI—Application-Layer Protocol Control Information
 API—Application Programming Interface
 APIC—Advanced Programmable Interrupt Controller
 APIPA—Automatic Private IP Addressing
 APL—A Programming Language
 APR—Apache Portable Runtime
 ARC—Adaptive Replacement Cache
 ARC—Advanced RISC Computing
 ARIN—American Registry for Internet Numbers
 ARM—Advanced RISC Machines
 AROS—AROS Research Operating System
 ARP—Address Resolution Protocol
 ARPA—Address and Routing Parameter Area
 ARPA—Advanced Research Projects Agency
 ARPANET—Advanced Research Projects Agency Network
 AS—Access Server
 ASCII—American Standard Code for Information Interchange
 AuthIP—Authenticated Internet Protocol
 ASG—Abstract Semantic Graph
 ASIC—Application-Specific Integrated Circuit
 ASIMO—Advanced Step in Innovative Mobility
 ASLR—Address Space Layout Randomization
 ASM—Algorithmic State Machine
 ASMP—Asymmetric Multiprocessing
 ASN.1—Abstract Syntax Notation 1
 ASP—Active Server Pages
 ASP—Application Service Provider
 ASR—Asynchronous Signal Routine
 AST—Abstract Syntax Tree
 AT—Advanced Technology
 AT—Access Time
 AT—Active Terminator
 ATA—Advanced Technology Attachment
 ATAG—Authoring Tool Accessibility Guidelines
 ATAPI—Advanced Technology Attachment Packet Interface
 ATM—Asynchronous Transfer Mode
 AuthN—Authentication
 AuthZ—Authorization
 AV—Antivirus
 AVC—Advanced Video Coding
 AVI—Audio Video Interleaved
 AWK—Aho Weinberger Kernighan
 AWS—Amazon Web Services
 AWT—Abstract Window Toolkit

B 

 B2B—Business-to-Business
 B2C—Business-to-Consumer
 B2E—Business-to-Employee
 BAL—Basic Assembly Language
 BAM—Block Availability Map
 Bash—Bourne-again shell
 BASIC—Beginner's All-Purpose Symbolic Instruction Code
 BBP—Baseband Processor
 BBS—Bulletin Board System
 BC—Business Continuity
 BCC—Blind Carbon Copy
 BCD—Binary Coded Decimal
 BCD—Boot Configuration Data
 BCNF—Boyce–Codd normal form
 BCP—Business Continuity Planning
 BE—Backend
 BEEP—Blocks Extensible Exchange Protocol
 BER—Bit Error Rate
 BFD—Bidirectional Forwarding Detection
 BFD—Binary File Descriptor
 BFS—Breadth-First Search
 BFT—Byzantine Fault Tolerant
 BGP—Border Gateway Protocol
 BI—Business Intelligence
 BiDi—Bi-Directional
 bin—binary
 BINAC—Binary Automatic Computer
 BIND—Berkeley Internet Name Domain
 BIOS—Basic Input Output System
 BJT—Bipolar Junction Transistor
 bit—binary digit
 Blob—Binary large object
 Blog—Web Log
 BMP—Basic Multilingual Plane
 BNC—Baby Neill Constant
 BOINC—Berkeley Open Infrastructure for Network Computing
 BOM—Byte Order Mark
 BOOTP—Bootstrap Protocol
 BPDU—Bridge Protocol Data Unit
 BPEL—Business Process Execution Language
 BPL—Broadband over Power Lines
 BPM—Business Process Management
 BPM—Business Process Modeling
 bps—bits per second
 BRM—Business Reference Model
 BRMS—Business Rule Management System
 BRR—Business Readiness Rating
 BRS—Broadband Radio Service
 BSA—Business Software Alliance
 BSB—Backside Bus
 BSD—Berkeley Software Distribution
 BSoD—Blue Screen of Death
 BSS—Block Started by Symbol
 BT—BitTorrent
 BT—Bluetooth 
 B TAM—Basic Telecommunications Access Method
 BW—Bandwidth
 BYOD—Bring Your Own Device
 Byte—By eight (group of 8 bits)

C 

 CA—Computer Accountancy 
 CAD—Computer-Aided Design
 CAE—Computer-Aided Engineering
 CAID—Computer-Aided Industrial Design
 CAI—Computer-Aided Instruction
 CAM—Computer-Aided Manufacturing
 CAP—Consistency Availability Partition tolerance (theorem)
 CAPTCHA—Completely Automated Public Turing Test to tell Computers and Humans Apart
 CAT—Computer-Aided Translation
 CAQ—Computer-Aided Quality Assurance
 CASE—Computer-Aided Software Engineering
 cc—C Compiler
 CC—Carbon Copy
 CD—Compact Disc
 CDE—Common Desktop Environment
 CDFS—Compact Disk File System
 CDMA—Code-Division Multiple Access
 CDN—Content Delivery Network
 CDP—Cisco Discovery Protocol
 CDP—Continuous Data Protection
 CD-R—CD-Recordable
 CD-ROM—CD Read-Only Memory
 CD-RW—CD-Rewritable
 CDSA—Common Data Security Architecture
 CERT—Computer Emergency Response Team
 CES—Consumer Electronics Show
 CF—Compact Flash
 CFD—Computational Fluid Dynamics
 CFG—Context-Free Grammar
 CFG—Control-Flow Graph
 CG—Computer Graphics
 CGA—Color Graphics Array
 CGI—Common Gateway Interface
 CGI—Computer-Generated Imagery
 CGT—Computational Graph Theory
 CHAP—Challenge-Handshake Authentication Protocol
 CHS—Cylinder-Head-Sector
 CIDR—Classless Inter-Domain Routing
 CIFS—Common Internet Filesystem
 CIM—Common Information Model
 CIM—Computationally Independent Model
 CIO—Chief Information Officer
 CIR—Committed information rate
 CISC—Complex Instruction Set Computer
 CJK—Chinese, Japanese, and Korean
 CJKV—Chinese, Japanese, Korean, and Vietnamese
 CLI—Command Line Interface
 CLR—Common Language Runtime
 CM—Configuration Management
 CM—Content Management
 CMDB—Configuration Management Database
 CMMI—Capability Maturity Model Integration
 CMOS—Complementary Metal-Oxide Semiconductor
 CMO—Current Mode of Operation
 CMS—Content Management System
 CN—Canonical Name
 CN—Common Name
 CNC—Computer Numerical Control
 CNG—Cryptographic Next Generation
 CNG—Cryptography Next Generation
 CNR—Communications and Networking Riser
 COBOL—Common Business-Oriented Language
 COM—Component Object Model or communication
 CORBA—Common Object Request Broker Architecture
 CORS—Cross-Origin Resource Sharing
 COTS—Commercial Off-The-Shelf
 CPA—Cell Processor Architecture
 CPAN—Comprehensive Perl Archive Network
 CP/M—Control Program/Monitor
 CPRI—Common Public Radio Interface
 CPS—characters per second
 CPU—Central Processing Unit
 CQS—Command–query separation
 CQRS—Command Query Responsibility Segregation
 CR—Carriage Return
 CRAN—Comprehensive R Archive Network
 CRC—Cyclic Redundancy Check
 CRLF—Carriage Return Line Feeds
 CRM—Customer Relationship Management
 CRS—Computer Reservations System
 CRT—Cathode-Ray Tube
 CRUD—Create, Read, Update and Delete
 CS—Cable Select
 CS—Computer Science
 CSE—Computer Science and Engineering
 CSI—Common System Interface
 CSM—Compatibility Support Module
 CSMA/CD—Carrier-sense multiple access with collision detection
 CSP—Cloud Service Provider
 CSP—Communicating Sequential Processes
 CSRF—Cross-Site Request Forgery
 CSS—Cascading Style Sheets
 CSS—Content-Scrambling System
 CSS—Closed Source Software
 CSS—Cross-Site Scripting
 CSV—Comma-Separated Values
 CT—Computerized Tomography
 CTAN—Comprehensive TeX Archive Network
 CTCP—Client-To-Client Protocol
 CTI—Computer Telephony Integration
 CTFE—Compile-time function execution
 CTL—Computational Tree Logic
 CTM—Close To Metal
 CTS—Clear To Send
 CTSS—Compatible Time-Sharing System
 CUA—Common User Access
 CVE—Common Vulnerabilities and Exposures
 CVS—Concurrent Versioning System
 CX—Customer Experience

D 

 DAC—Digital-To-Analog Converter
 DAC—Discretionary Access Control
 DAL—Database Abstraction Layer
 DAO—Data Access Object
 DAO—Data Access Objects
 DAO—Disk-At-Once
 DAP—Directory Access Protocol
 DARPA—Defense Advanced Research Projects Agency
 DAS—Direct Attached Storage
 DAT—Digital Audio Tape
 DB—Database
 DSKT—Desktop
 DBA—Database Administrator
 DBCS—Double Byte Character Set
 DBMS—Database Management System
 DCC—Direct Client-to-Client
 DCCP—Datagram Congestion Control Protocol
 DCCA—Debian Common Core Alliance
 DCL—Data Control Language
 DCS—Distributed Control System
 DCMI—Dublin Core Metadata Initiative
 DCOM—Distributed Component Object Model
 DD—Double Density
 DDE—Dynamic Data Exchange
 DDI—DNS DHCP & IP Address management
 DDL—Data Definition Language
 DDoS—Distributed Denial of Service
 DDR—Double Data Rate
 DEC—Digital Equipment Corporation
 DES—Data Encryption Standard
 dev—development
 DFA—Deterministic Finite Automaton
 DFD—Data Flow Diagram
 DFS—Depth-First Search
 DFS—Distributed File System
 DGD—Dworkin's Game Driver
 DHCP—Dynamic Host Configuration Protocol
 DHTML—Dynamic Hypertext Markup Language
 DIF—Data Integrity Field
 DIMM—Dual Inline Memory Module
 DIN—Deutsches Institut für Normung
 DIP—Dual In-line Package
 DISM—Deployment Image and Service Management Tool
 DIVX—Digital Video Express
 DKIM—Domain Keys Identified Mail
 DL—Download
 DLL—Dynamic Link Library
 DLNA—Digital Living Network Alliance
 DMA—Direct Memory Access
 DMCA—Digital Millennium Copyright Act
 DMI—Direct Media Interface
 DML—Data Manipulation Language
 DML—Definitive Media Library
 DMR—Dennis M. Ritchie
 DMZ—Demilitarized Zone
 DN—Distinguished Name
 DND—Drag-and-Drop
 DNS—Domain Name System
 DOA—Dead on Arrival
 DOCSIS—Data Over Cable Service Interface Specification
 DOM—Document Object Model
 DoS—Denial of Service
 DOS—Disk Operating System
 DP—Dot Pitch
 DPC—Deferred Procedure Call
 DPI—Deep Packet Inspection
 DPI—Dots Per Inch
 DPMI—DOS Protected Mode Interface
 DPMS—Display Power Management Signaling
 DR—Disaster Recovery
 DRAM—Dynamic Random-Access Memory
 DR-DOS—Digital Research - Disk Operating System
 DRI—Direct Rendering Infrastructure
 DRM—Digital Rights Management
 DRM—Direct Rendering Manager
 DSA—Digital Signature Algorithm
 DSDL—Document Schema Definition Languages
 DSDM—Dynamic Systems Development Method
 DSL—Digital Subscriber Line
 DSL—Domain-Specific Language
 DSLAM—Digital Subscriber Line Access Multiplexer
 DSN—Database Source Name
 DSN—Data Set Name
 DSP—Digital Signal Processor
 DSSSL—Document Style Semantics and Specification Language
 DTD—Document Type Definition
 DTE—Data Terminal Equipment or data transfer rate
 DTO—Data Transfer Object
 DTP—Desktop Publishing
 DTR—Data Terminal Ready or Data transfer rate
 DVD—Digital Versatile Disc or Digital Video Disc
 DVD-R—DVD-Recordable
 DVD-ROM—DVD-Read Only Memory
 DVD-RW—DVD-Rewritable
 DVI—Digital Visual Interface
 DVR—Digital Video Recorder
 DW—Data Warehouse

E 

 EAI—Enterprise Application Integration
 EAP—Extensible Authentication Protocol
 EAS—Exchange ActiveSync
 EBCDIC—Extended Binary Coded Decimal Interchange Code
 EBML—Extensible Binary Meta Language
 ECC—Elliptic Curve Cryptography
 ECMA—European Computer Manufacturers Association
 ECN—Explicit Congestion Notification
 ECOS—Embedded Configurable Operating System
 ECRS—Expense and Cost Recovery System
 ECS—Entity-Component-System
 EDA—Electronic Design Automation
 EDGE—Enhanced Data rates for GSM Evolution
 EDI—Electronic Data Interchange
 EDO—Extended Data Out
 EDSAC—Electronic Delay Storage Automatic Calculator
 EDVAC—Electronic Discrete Variable Automatic Computer
 EEPROM—Electronically Erasable Programmable Read-Only Memory
 EFF—Electronic Frontier Foundation
 EFI—Extensible Firmware Interface
 EFM—Eight-to-Fourteen Modulation
 EFM—Ethernet in the First Mile
 EFS—Encrypting File System
 EGA—Enhanced Graphics Array
 E-mail—Electronic mail
 EGP—Exterior Gateway Protocol
 eID—electronic ID card
 EIDE—Enhanced IDE
 EIGRP—Enhanced Interior Gateway Routing Protocol
 EISA—Extended Industry Standard Architecture
 ELF—Extremely Low Frequency
 ELF—Executable and Linkable Format
 ELM—ELectronic Mail
 EMACS—Editor MACroS
 EMS—Expanded Memory Specification
 ENIAC—Electronic Numerical Integrator And Computer
 EOD—End of Day
 EOF—End of File
 EOL—End of Life
 EOL—End of Line
 EOM—End of Message
 EOS—End of Support
 EPIC—Explicitly Parallel Instruction Computing
 EPROM—Erasable Programmable Read-Only Memory
 ERD—Entity-Relationship Diagram
 ERM—Entity-Relationship Model
 ERP—Enterprise Resource Planning
 eSATA—external SATA
 ESB—Enterprise service bus
 ESCON—Enterprise Systems Connection
 ESD—Electrostatic Discharge
 ESI—Electronically Stored Information
 ESR—Eric Steven Raymond
 ETL—Extract, Transform, Load
 ETW—Event Tracing for Windows
 EUC—Extended Unix Code
 EULA—End User License Agreement
 EWM—Enterprise Work Management
 EWMH—Extended Window Manager Hints
 EXT—EXTended file system
 ETA—Estimated Time of Arrival

F 

 FAP—FORTRAN Assembly Program
 FASM—Flat ASseMbler
 FAT—File Allocation Table
 FAQ—Frequently Asked Questions
 FBDIMM—Fully Buffered Dual Inline Memory Module
 FC-AL—Fibre Channel Arbitrated Loop
 FCB—File Control Block
 FCS—Frame Check Sequence
 FDC—Floppy-Disk Controller
 FDS—Fedora Directory Server
 FDD—Frequency-Division Duplexing
 FDD—Floppy Disk Drive
 FDDI—Fiber Distributed Data Interface
 FDM—Frequency-Division Multiplexing
 FDMA—Frequency-Division Multiple Access
 FE—Frontend
 FEC—Forward Error Correction
 FEMB—Front-End Motherboard
 FET—Field Effect Transistor
 FHS—Filesystem Hierarchy Standard
 FICON—FIber CONnectivity
 FIFO—First In First Out
 FIPS—Federal Information Processing Standards
 FL—Function Level
 FLAC—Free Lossless Audio Codec
 FLOPS—FLoating-Point Operations Per Second
 FLOSS—Free/Libre/Open-Source Software
 FMC—Fixed Mobile Convergence "Mobile UC or Unified Communications over Wireless" 
 FMO—Future Mode of Operation
 FOLDOC—Free On-line Dictionary of Computing
 FORTRAN—Formula Translation
 FOSDEM—Free and Open-source Software Developers' European Meeting
 FOSI—Formatted Output Specification Instance
 FOSS—Free and Open-Source Software
 FP—Function Programming
 FP—Functional Programming
 FPGA—Field Programmable Gate Array
 FPS—Floating Point Systems
 FPU—Floating-Point Unit
 FRU—Field-Replaceable Unit
 FS—File System
 FSB—Front-Side Bus
 fsck—File System Check
 FSF—Free Software Foundation
 FSM—Finite State Machine
 FTTA—Fiber To The Antenna
 FTTC—Fiber To The Curb
 FTTH—Fiber To The Home
 FTTP—Fiber To The Premises
 FTP—File Transfer Protocol
 FQDN—Fully Qualified Domain Name
 FUD—Fear Uncertainty Doubt
 FWS—Folding White Space
 FXP—File eXchange Protocol
 FYI—For Your Information
 FVEK—Full Volume Encryption Key

G 

 G11N—Globalization
 Gas—GNU Assembler
 Gb—Gigabit
 GB—Gigabyte
 Gbps—Gigabits per second
 GCC—GNU Compiler Collection
 GCJ—GNU Compiler for Java
 GCP—Google Cloud Platform
 GCR—Group Coded Recording
 GDB—GNU Debugger
 GDI—Graphics Device Interface
 GFDL—GNU Free Documentation License
 GIF—Graphics Interchange Format
 GIGO—Garbage In, Garbage Out
 GIMP—GNU Image Manipulation Program
 GIMPS—Great Internet Mersenne Prime Search
 GIS—Geographic Information System
 GLUT—OpenGL Utility Toolkit
 GML—Geography Markup Language
 GNOME—GNU Network Object Model Environment
 GNU—GNU's Not Unix
 GOMS—Goals, Operators, Methods, and Selection rules
 GPASM—GNU PIC ASseMbler
 GPFS—General Parallel File System
 GPG—GNU Privacy Guard
 GPGPU—General-Purpose Computing on Graphics Processing Units
 GPIB—General-Purpose Instrumentation Bus
 GPL—General Public License
 GPL—General-Purpose Language
 GPRS—General Packet Radio Service
 GPT—GUID Partition Table
 GPU—Graphics Processing Unit
 GRUB—Grand Unified Boot-Loader
 GERAN—GSM EDGE Radio Access Network
 GSM—Global System for Mobile Communications
 GTK+—GIMP Toolkit
 GUI—Graphical User Interface
 GUID—Globally Unique IDentifier
 GWT—Google Web Toolkit
 GYR—IT Networking

H 

 HA—High availability
 HAL—Hardware Abstraction Layer
 HARD—HTML Application Rapid Development
 HASP—Houston Automatic Spooling Priority
 HBA—Host Bus Adapter
 HCI—Human—Computer Interaction
 HD—High Density
 HDD—Hard Disk Drive
 HCL—Hardware Compatibility List
 HD DVD—High Definition DVD
 HDL—Hardware Description Language
 HDMI—High-Definition Multimedia Interface
 HECI—Host Embedded Controller Interface
 HF—High Frequency
 HFS—Hierarchical File System
 HHD—Hybrid Hard Drive
 HID—Human Interface Device
 HIG—Human Interface Guidelines
 HIRD—Hurd of Interfaces Representing Depth
 HLASM—High Level ASseMbler
 HLS—HTTP Live Streaming
 HMA—High Memory Area
 HP—Hewlett-Packard
 HPC—High-Performance Computing
 HPFS—High Performance File System
 HSDPA—High-Speed Downlink Packet Access
 HTC—High-Throughput Computing
 HSM—Hierarchical Storage Management
 HT—Hyper Threading
 HTM—Hierarchical Temporal Memory
 HTML—Hypertext Markup Language
 HTTP—Hypertext Transfer Protocol
 HTTPd—Hypertext Transport Protocol Daemon
 HTTPS—HTTP Secure
 HTX—HyperTransport eXpansion
 HURD—Hird of Unix-Replacing Daemons
 HVD—Holographic Versatile Disc
 Hz—Hertz

I 

 I²C—Inter-Integrated Circuit
 I²S—Integrated Interchip Sound
 I18N—Internationalization
 IANA—Internet Assigned Numbers Authority
 IaaS—Infrastructure as a Service
 IaC—Infrastructure as Code
 iBCS—Intel Binary Compatibility Standard
 IBM—International Business Machines
 IC—Integrated Circuit
 ICANN—Internet Corporation for Assigned Names and Numbers
 ICE—In-Circuit Emulator
 ICE—Intrusion Countermeasure Electronics
 ICH—I/O Controller Hub 
 ICMP—Internet Control Message Protocol
 ICP—Internet Cache Protocol
 ICS—Internet Connection Sharing
 ICT—Information and Communication Technology
 IDE—Integrated Development Environment
 IDE—Integrated Drive Electronics
 IDF—Intermediate Distribution Frame
 IDF—Intermediate Data Format
 IDL—Interactive Data Language
 IDL—Interface Definition Language
 IdP—Identity Provider (cybersecurity)
 IDS—Intrusion Detection System
 IE—Internet Explorer
 IEC—International Electrotechnical Commission
 IEEE—Institute of Electrical and Electronics Engineers
 IETF—Internet Engineering Task Force
 IFL—Integrated Facility for Linux
 IGMP—Internet Group Management Protocol
 IGRP—Interior Gateway Routing Protocol
 IHV—Independent Hardware Vendor
 IIOP—Internet Inter-Orb Protocol
 IIS—Internet Information Services
 IKE—Internet Key Exchange
 IL—Intermediate Language
 IM—Instant Message or Instant Messaging
 IMAP—Internet Message Access Protocol
 IME—Input Method Editor
 INFOSEC—Information Systems Security
 I/O—Input/output
 IoT—Internet of Things
 IP—Intellectual Property
 IP—Internet Protocol
 IPAM—IP Address Management
 IPC—Inter-Process Communication
 IPL—Initial Program Load
 IPMI—Intelligent Platform Management Interface
 IPO—Inter Procedural Optimization
 IPP—Internet Printing Protocol
 IPS—In-Plane Switching
 IPS—Instructions Per Second
 IPS—Intrusion Prevention System
 IPsec—Internet Protocol security
 IPTV—Internet Protocol Television
 IPv4—Internet Protocol version 4
 IPv6—Internet Protocol version 6
 IPX—Internetwork Packet Exchange
 IR—Intermediate Representation
 IRC—Internet Relay Chat
 IrDA—Infrared Data Association
 IRI—Internationalized Resource Identifier 
 IRP—I/O Request Packet
 IRQ—Interrupt Request
 IS—Information Systems
 IS-IS—Intermediate System to Intermediate System
 ISA—Industry Standard Architecture
 ISA—Instruction Set Architecture
 ISAM—Indexed Sequential Access Method
 ISATAP—Intra-Site Automatic Tunnel Addressing Protocol
 ISC—Internet Storm Center
 iSCSI—Internet Small Computer System Interface
 ISDN—Integrated Services Digital Network
 ISO—International Organization for Standardization
 iSNS—Internet Storage Name Service
 ISP—Internet Service Provider
 ISPF—Interactive System Productivity Facility
 ISR—Interrupt Service Routine
 ISV—Independent Software Vendor
 IT—Information Technology
 ITIL—Information Technology Infrastructure Library
 ITL—Interval Temporal Logic
 ITU—International Telecommunication Union
 IVR(S)—Interactive Voice Response (System)

J 

 J2EE—Java 2 Enterprise Edition
 J2ME—Java 2 Micro Edition
 J2SE—Java 2 Standard Edition
 JAXB—Java Architecture for XML Binding
 JAX-RPC—Java XML for Remote Procedure Calls
 JAXP—Java API for XML Processing
 JBOD—Just a Bunch of Disks
 JCE Java Cryptography Extension
 JCL—Job Control Language
 JCP—Java Community Process
 JDBC—Java Database Connectivity
 JDK—Java Development Kit
 JEE—Java Enterprise Edition
 JES—Job Entry Subsystem
 JDS—Java Desktop System
 JFC—Java Foundation Classes
 JFET—Junction Field-Effect Transistor
 JFS—IBM Journaling File System
 JINI—Jini Is Not Initials
 JIT—Just-In-Time
 JME—Java Micro Edition
 JMX—Java Management Extensions
 JMS—Java Message Service
 JNDI—Java Naming and Directory Interface
 JNI—Java Native Interface
 JNZ—Jump non-zero
 JPEG—Joint Photographic Experts Group
 JRE—Java Runtime Environment
 JS—JavaScript
 JSE—Java Standard Edition
 JSON—JavaScript Object Notation
 JSP—Jackson Structured Programming
 JSP—JavaServer Pages
 JTAG—Joint Test Action Group
 JVM—Java Virtual Machine

K 

 K&R—Kernighan and Ritchie
 KB—Keyboard
 Kb—Kilobit
 KB—Kilobyte
 KB—Knowledge Base
 Kbps—Kilobits per second
 KiB—Kibibyte
 KDE—K Desktop Environment
 kHz—Kilohertz
 KM—Knowledge Machine
 KRL—Knowledge Representation Language
 KVM—Keyboard, Video, Mouse

L 

 L10N—Localization
 L2TP—Layer two Tunneling Protocol
 LACP—Link Aggregation Control Protocol
 LAMP—Linux Apache MySQL Perl
 LAMP—Linux Apache MySQL PHP
 LAMP—Linux Apache MySQL Python
 LAN—Local Area Network
 LBA—Logical Block Addressing
 LB—Load Balancer
 LCD—Liquid Crystal Display
 LCR—Least Cost Routing
 LCOS—Liquid Crystal On Silicon
 LDAP—Lightweight Directory Access Protocol
 LE—Logical Extents
 LED—Light-Emitting Diode
 LF—Line Feed
 LF—Low Frequency
 LFS—Linux From Scratch
 LGA—Land Grid Array
 LGPL—Lesser General Public License
 LIB—LIBrary
 LIF—Low Insertion Force
 LIFO—Last In First Out
 LILO—Linux Loader
 LIP—Loop Initialization Primitive
 LISP—LISt Processing
 LKML—Linux Kernel Mailing List
 LM—Lan Manager
 LOC—Lines of Code
 LPC—Lars Pensjö C
 LPI—Lines Per Inch
 LPI—Linux Professional Institute
 LPT Line Print Terminal
 LRU—Least Recently Used
 LSB—Least Significant Bit
 LSB—Linux Standard Base
 LSI—Large-Scale Integration
 LTE—Long Term Evolution
 LTL—Linear Temporal Logic
 LTR—Left-to-Right
 LUG—Linux User Group
 LUN—Logical Unit Number
 LV—Logical Volume
 LVD—Low Voltage Differential
 LVM—Logical Volume Management
 LZW—Lempel-Ziv-Welch

M 

 MAC—Mandatory Access Control
 MAC—Media Access Control
 MANET—Mobile Ad-Hoc Network
 MAN—Metropolitan Area Network
 MAPI—Messaging Application Programming Interface
 MBCS—Multi Byte Character Set
 MBD—Model-Based Design
 MBR—Master Boot Record
 Mb—Megabit
 MB—Megabyte
 Mbps—Megabits per second
 MCAD—Microsoft Certified Application Developer
 MCAS—Microsoft Certified Application Specialist
 MCA—Micro Channel Architecture
 MCA—Microsoft Certified Architect
 MCDBA—Microsoft Certified DataBase Administrator
 MCDST—Microsoft Certified Desktop Support Technician
 MCITP—Microsoft Certified Information Technology Professional
 MCM—Microsoft Certified Master
 MCPC—Multiple Channels Per Carrier 
 MCPD—Microsoft Certified Professional Developer
 MCP—Microsoft Certified Professional
 MCSA—Microsoft Certified Systems Administrator
 MCSD—Microsoft Certified Solution Developer
 MCSE—Microsoft Certified Systems Engineer
 MCTS—Microsoft Certified Technology Specialist
 MCT—Microsoft Certified Trainer
 MDA—Monochrome Display Adapter
 MDA—Mail Delivery Agent
 MDA—Model-Driven Architecture
 MDD/MDSD—Model-Driven (Software) Development
 MDF—Main Distribution Frame
 MDI—Multiple-Document Interface
 MDM—Master Data Management
 ME—Microsoft Edge
 ME—[Windows] Millennium Edition
 MFA—Multi-factor authentication
 MFC—Microsoft Foundation Classes
 MFM—Modified Frequency Modulation
 MF—Medium Frequency
 MGCP—Media Gateway Control Protocol
 MHz—Megahertz
 MIB—Management Information Base
 MICR—Magnetic Ink Character Recognition or Magnetic Ink Character Reader
 MIDI—Musical Instrument Digital Interface
 MIMD—Multiple Instruction, Multiple Data
 MIME—Multipurpose Internet Mail Extensions
 MIMO—Multiple-Input Multiple-Output
 MINIX—MIni-uNIX
 MIPS—Microprocessor without Interlocked Pipeline Stages
 MIPS—Million Instructions Per Second
 MISD—Multiple Instruction, Single Data
 MIS—Management Information Systems
 MIT—Massachusetts Institute of Technology
 ML—Machine Learning
 MMC—Microsoft Management Console
 MMDS—Mortality Medical Data System
 MMDS—Multichannel Multipoint Distribution Service
 MMF—Multi-Mode (optical) Fiber
 MMIO—Memory-Mapped I/O
 MMI—Man Machine Interface.
 MMORPG—Massively Multiplayer Online Role-Playing Game
 MMS—Multimedia Message Service
 MMU—Memory Management Unit
 MMX—Multi-Media Extensions
 MNG—Multiple-image Network Graphics
 MoBo—Motherboard
 MOM—Message-Oriented Middleware
 MOO—MUD Object Oriented
 MOP—Meta-Object Protocol
 MOSFET—Metal-Oxide Semiconductor Field Effect Transistor
 MOS—Microsoft Office Specialist
 MOTD—Message Of The Day
 MOUS—Microsoft Office User Specialist
 MOV—Apple QuickTime Multimedia File
 MPAA—Motion Picture Association of America
 MPEG—Motion Pictures Experts Group
 MPLS—Multiprotocol Label Switching
 MPL—Mozilla Public License
 MPU—Microprocessor Unit
 MS-DOS—Microsoft DOS
 MSA—Mail Submission Agent
 MSB—Most Significant Bit
 MSDN—Microsoft Developer Network
 MSI—Medium-Scale Integration
 MSI—Message Signaled Interrupt
 MSI—Microsoft Installer
 MSN—Microsoft Network
 MS—Microsoft
 MS—Memory Stick
 MTA—Mail Transfer Agent
 MTA—Microsoft Technology Associate
 MTBF—Mean Time Between Failures
 MTU—Maximum Transmission Unit
 MT—Machine Translation
 MUA—Mail User Agent
 MUD—Multi-User Dungeon
 MU—Memory Unit
 MVC—Model-View-Controller
 MVP—Most Valuable Professional
 MVS—Multiple Virtual Storage
 MWC—Mobile World Congress
 MXF—Material Exchange Format
 MX—Mail exchange

N 

 NAC—Network Access Control
 NACK—Negative ACKnowledgement
 NAK—Negative AcKnowledge Character
 NaN—Not a Number
 NAP—Network Access Protection
 NAS—Network-Attached Storage
 NASM—Netwide ASseMbler
 NAT—Network Address Translation
 NCP—NetWare Core Protocol
 NCQ—Native Command Queuing
 NCSA—National Center for Supercomputing Applications
 NDIS—Network Driver Interface Specification
 NDPS—Novell Distributed Print Services
 NDS—Novell Directory Services
 NEP—Network Equipment Provider
 NetBIOS—Network Basic Input/Output System
 NetBT—NetBIOS over TCP/IP
 NEXT—Near-End CrossTalk
 NFA—Nondeterministic Finite Automaton
 NFC—Near-field communication
 NFS—Network File System
 NGL—aNGeL
 NGSCB—Next-Generation Secure Computing Base
 NI—National Instruments
 NIC—Network Interface Controller or Network Interface Card
 NIM—No Internal Message
 NIO—Non-blocking I/O
 NIST—National Institute of Standards and Technology
 NLE—Non-Linear Editing system
 NLP—Natural Language Processing
 NLS—Native Language Support
 NMI—Non-Maskable Interrupt
 NNTP—Network News Transfer Protocol
 NOC—Network Operations Center
 NOP—No OPeration
 NOS—Network Operating System
 NP—Nondeterministic Polynomial time
 NPL—Netscape Public License
 NPTL—Native POSIX Thread Library
 NPU—Network Processing Unit
 NS—Netscape
 NSA—Network Security Appliance
 NSI—Network Service Interface
 NSPR—Netscape Portable Runtime
 NSS—Novell Storage Service
 NSS—Network Security Services
 NSS—Name Service Switch
 NT—New Technology
 NTFS—NT Filesystem
 NTLM—NT Lan Manager
 NTP—Network Time Protocol
 NUMA—Non-Uniform Memory Access
 NURBS—Non-Uniform Rational B-Spline
 NVR—Network Video Recorder
 NVRAM—Non-Volatile Random Access Memory

O 

 OASIS—Organization for the Advancement of Structured Information Standards
 OAT—Operational Acceptance Testing
 OBSAI—Open Base Station Architecture Initiative
 ODBC—Open Database Connectivity
 OEM—Original Equipment Manufacturer
 OES—Open Enterprise Server
 OFDM—Orthogonal Frequency-Division Multiplexing
 OFTC—Open and Free Technology Community
 OID—Object Identifier
 OLAP—Online Analytical Processing
 OLE—Object Linking and Embedding
 OLED—Organic Light Emitting Diode
 OLPC—One Laptop per Child
 OLTP—Online Transaction Processing
 OMF—Object Module Format
 OMG—Object Management Group
 OMR—Optical Mark Reader
 OO—Object-Oriented
 OO—OpenOffice
 OOE—Out-of-Order Execution
 OOM—Out Of Memory
 OOo—OpenOffice.org
 OoOE—Out-of-Order Execution
 OOP—Object-Oriented Programming
 OOTB—Out of the box
 OPML—Outline Processor Markup Language
 ORB—Object Request Broker
 ORM—Object-Relational Mapping
 OS—Open Source
 OS—Operating System
 OSCON—O'Reilly Open Source CONvention
 OSDN—Open Source Development Network
 OSI—Open Source Initiative
 OSI—Open Systems Interconnection
 OSPF—Open Shortest Path First
 OSS—Open Sound System
 OSS—Open-Source Software
 OSS—Operations Support System
 OSTG—Open Source Technology Group
 OTP—One-time password
 OUI—Organisationally Unique Identifier

P 

 P2P—Peer-To-Peer
 PaaS—Platform as a Service
 PAM—Privileged Access Management
 PAN—Personal Area Network
 PAP—Password Authentication Protocol
 PARC—Palo Alto Research Center
 PATA—Parallel ATA
 PBS—Portable Batch System
 PC—Personal Computer
 PCB—Printed Circuit Board
 PCB—Process Control Block
 PC DOS—Personal Computer Disc Operating System
 PCI—Peripheral Component Interconnect
 PCIe—PCI Express
 PCI-X—PCI Extended
 PCL—Printer Command Language
 PCMCIA—Personal Computer Memory Card International Association
 PCM—Pulse-Code Modulation
 PCRE—Perl Compatible Regular Expressions
 PD—Public Domain
 PDA—Personal Digital Assistant
 PDF—Portable Document Format
 PDH—Plesiochronous Digital Hierarchy
 PDP—Programmed Data Processor
 PE—Physical Extents
 PERL—Practical Extraction and Reporting Language
 PFA—Please Find Attachment
 PG—Peripheral Gateway
 PGA—Pin Grid Array
 PGA—Programmable Gate Array
 PGO—Profile-Guided Optimization
 PGP—Pretty Good Privacy
 PHP—Hypertext Preprocessor
 PIC—Peripheral Interface Controller
 PIC—Programmable Interrupt Controller
 PID—Proportional-Integral-Derivative
 PID—Process ID
 PIM—Personal Information Manager
 PINE—Program for Internet News and Email
 PIM—Platform Independent Model
 PING—Packet Internet Gopher
 PIO—Programmed Input/Output
 PKCS—Public Key Cryptography Standards
 PKI—Public Key Infrastructure
 PLC—Power Line Communication
 PLC—Programmable Logic Controller
 PLD—Programmable Logic Device
 PL/I—Programming Language One
 PL/M—Programming Language for Microcomputers
 PL/P—Programming Language for Prime
 PLT—Power Line Telecommunications
 PMM—POST Memory Manager
 PNG—Portable Network Graphics
 PnP—Plug-and-Play
 PNRP—Peer Name Resolution Protocol
 PoE—Power over Ethernet
 PoS—Point of Sale
 POCO—Plain Old Class Object
 POID—Persistent Object Identifier
 POJO—Plain Old Java Object
 POP—Point of Presence
 POP3—Post Office Protocol v3
 POSIX—Portable Operating System Interface, formerly IEEE-IX
 POST—Power-On Self Test
 PPC—PowerPC
 PPI—Pixels Per Inch
 PPM—Pages Per Minute
 PPP—Point-to-Point Protocol
 PPPoA—PPP over ATM
 PPPoE—PPP over Ethernet
 PPTP—Point-to-Point Tunneling Protocol
 PR—Pull Request
 PROM—Programmable Read-Only Memory
 PS—PostScript
 PS/2—Personal System/2
 PSA—Professional Services Automation
 PSM—Platform Specific Model
 PSTN—Public Switched Telephone Network
 PSU—Power Supply Unit
 PSVI—Post-Schema-Validation Infoset
 PTS-DOS—PhysTechSoft – Disk Operating System
 PV—Physical Volume
 PVG—Physical Volume Group
 PVR—Personal Video Recorder
 PXE—Preboot Execution Environment
 PXI—PCI eXtensions for Instrumentation
 PRC—Procedure Remote Call

Q 

 QDR—Quad Data Rate
 QA—Quality Assurance
 QFP—Quad Flat Package
 QoS—Quality of Service
 QOTD—Quote of the Day
 Qt—Quasar Toolkit
 QTAM—Queued Teleprocessing Access Method
 QSOP—Quarter Small Outline Package
 qWave—Quality Windows Audio/Video Experience

R 

 RACF—Resource Access Control Facility
 RAD—Rapid Application Development
 RADIUS—Remote Authentication Dial In User Service
 RAID—Redundant Array of Independent Disks
 RAII—Resource Acquisition Is Initialization
 RAIT—Redundant Array of Inexpensive Tapes
 RAM—Random-Access Memory
 RARP—Reverse Address Resolution Protocol
 RAS—Reliability, Availability and Serviceability
 RAS—Remote access service
 RC—Region Code
 RC—Release Candidate
 RC—Run Commands
 RCA—Root Cause Analysis
 RCS—Revision Control System
 RD—Remote Desktop
 rd—remove directory
 RDBMS—Relational Database Management System
 RDC—Remote Desktop Connection
 RDF—Resource Description Framework
 RDM—Relational Data Model
 RDOS—Real-time Disk Operating System
 RDP—Remote Desktop Protocol
 RDS—Remote Data Services
 REFAL—Recursive Functions Algorithmic Language
 REP—RAID Error Propagation
 REST—Representational State Transfer
 RESV—Reservation Message
 regex—Regular Expression
 regexp—Regular Expression
 RF—Radio Frequency
 RFC—Request For Comments
 RFI—Radio Frequency Interference
 RFID—Radio Frequency Identification
 RGB—Red, Green, Blue
 RGBA—Red, Green, Blue, Alpha
 RHL—Red Hat Linux
 RHEL—Red Hat Enterprise Linux
 RIA—Rich Internet Application
 RIAA—Recording Industry Association of America
 RIP—Raster Image Processor
 RIP—Routing Information Protocol
 RIR—Regional Internet registry
 RISC—Reduced Instruction Set Computer
 RISC OS—Reduced Instruction Set Computer Operating System
 RJE—Remote Job Entry
 RLE—Run-Length Encoding
 RLL—Run-Length Limited
 rmdir—remove directory
 RMI—Remote Method Invocation
 RMS—Richard Matthew Stallman
 ROM—Read-Only Memory
 ROMB—Read-Out Motherboard
 ROM-DOS—Read-Only Memory - Disk Operating System
 RPA—Robotic Process Automation
 RPC—Remote Procedure Call
 RPG—Report Program Generator
 RPM—RPM Package Manager
 RRAS—Routing and Remote Access Service
 RSA—Rivest Shamir Adleman
 RSI—Repetitive Strain Injury
 RSS—Radio Service Software
 RSS—Rich Site Summary, RDF Site Summary, or Really Simple Syndication
 RSVP—Resource Reservation Protocol
 RTAI—Real-Time Application Interface
 RTC—Real-Time Clock
 RTE—Real-Time Enterprise
 RTEMS—Real-Time Executive for Multiprocessor Systems
 RTF—Rich Text Format
 RTL—Right-to-Left
 RTMP—Real Time Messaging Protocol
 RTOS—Real-Time Operating System
 RTP—Real-time Transport Protocol
 RTS—Ready To Send
 RTSP—Real Time Streaming Protocol
 RTTI—Run-time Type Information
 RTU—Remote Terminal Unit
 RWD—Responsive Web Design

S 

 SaaS—Software as a Service
 SASS—Syntatically Awesome Style Sheets
 SAM—Security Account Manager
 SAN—Storage Area Network
 SAS—Serial attached SCSI
 SATA—Serial ATA
 SAX—Simple API for XML
 SBOD—Spinning Beachball of Death
 SBP-2—Serial Bus Protocol 2
 sbin—superuser binary
 sbs—Small Business Server
 SBU—Standard Build Unit
 SCADA—Supervisory Control And Data Acquisition
 SCID—Source Code in Database
 SCM—Software Configuration Management
 SCM—Source Code Management
 SCP—Secure Copy
 SCPC—Single Channel Per Carrier  
 SCPI—Standard Commands for Programmable Instrumentation
 SCSA—Secure Content Storage Association
 SCSI—Small Computer System Interface
 SCTP—Stream Control Transmission Protocol
 SD—Secure Digital
 SDDL—Security Descriptor Definition Language
 SDH—Synchronous Digital Hierarchy
 SDI—Single-Document Interface
 SEC—Single Edge Contact
 SDIO—Secure Digital Input Output
 SDK—Software Development Kit
 SDL—Simple DirectMedia Layer
 SDN—Service Delivery Network
 SDP—Session Description Protocol
 SDR—Software-Defined Radio
 SDRAM—Synchronous Dynamic Random Access Memory
 SDSL—Symmetric DSL
 SE—Single Ended
 SEI—Software Engineering Institute
 SEO—Search Engine Optimization
 SFTP—Secure FTP
 SFTP—Simple File Transfer Protocol
 SFTP—SSH File Transfer Protocol
 SGI—Silicon Graphics, Incorporated
 SGML—Standard Generalized Markup Language
 SGR—Select Graphic Rendition
 SHA—Secure Hash Algorithm
 SHDSL—Single-pair High-speed Digital Subscriber Line
 SIEM—Security information and event management
 SIGCAT—Special Interest Group on CD-ROM Applications and Technology
 SIGGRAPH—Special Interest Group on Graphics
 SIMD—Single Instruction, Multiple Data
 SIM—Subscriber Identification Module
 SIMM—Single Inline Memory Module
 SIP—Session Initiation Protocol
 SIP—Supplementary Ideographic Plane
 SISD—Single Instruction, Single Data
 SISO—Single-Input and Single-Output
 SLA—Service Level Agreement
 SLED—SUSE Linux Enterprise Desktop
 SLES—SUSE Linux Enterprise Server
 SLI—Scalable Link Interface
 SLIP—Serial Line Internet Protocol
 SLM—Service Level Management
 SLOC—Source Lines of Code
 SME—Subject Matter Expert
 SMF—Single-Mode (optical) Fiber
 SPM—Software project management
 SPMD—Single Program, Multiple Data
 SPOF—Single point of failure
 SMA—SubMiniature version A
 SMB—Server Message Block
 SMBIOS—System Management BIOS
 SMIL—Synchronized Multimedia Integration Language
 S/MIME—Secure/Multipurpose Internet Mail Extensions
 SMP—Supplementary Multilingual Plane
 SMP—Symmetric Multi-Processing
 SMPS—Switch Mode Power Supply
 SMS—Short Message Service
 SMS—System Management Server
 SMT—Simultaneous Multithreading
 SMTP—Simple Mail Transfer Protocol
 SNA—Systems Network Architecture
 SNMP—Simple Network Management Protocol
 SNTP—Simple Network Time Protocol
 SOA—Service-Oriented Architecture
 SOAP—Simple Object Access Protocol
 SOAP—Symbolic Optimal Assembly Program
 SOPA—Stop Online Piracy Act
 SoC—System-on-a-Chip
 SO-DIMM—Small Outline DIMM
 SOE—Standard Operating Environment
 SOHO—Small Office/Home Office
 SOI—Silicon On Insulator
 SP—Service Pack
 SPA—Single Page Application
 SPF—Sender Policy Framework
 SPI—Serial Peripheral Interface
 SPI—Stateful Packet Inspection
 SPARC—Scalable Processor Architecture
 SQL—Structured Query Language
 SRAM—Static Random Access Memory
 SSA—Static Single Assignment
 SSD—Software Specification Document
 SSD—Solid-State Drive
 SSDP—Simple Service Discovery Protocol
 SSE—Streaming SIMD Extensions
 SSH—Secure Shell
 SSI—Server Side Includes
 SSI—Single-System Image
 SSI—Small-Scale Integration
 SSID—Service Set Identifier
 SSL—Secure Socket Layer
 SSO—Single Sign On
 SSP—Supplementary Special-purpose Plane
 SSSE—Supplementary Streaming SIMD Extensions
 SSSP—Single Source Shortest Path
 SSTP—Secure Socket Tunneling Protocol
 su—superuser
 SUS—Single UNIX Specification
 SUSE—Software und System-Entwicklung
 SVC—Scalable Video Coding
 SVG—Scalable Vector Graphics
 SVGA—Super Video Graphics Array
 SVD—Structured VLSI Design
 SWF—Shock Wave Flash
 SWT—Standard Widget Toolkit
 Sysop—System operator
 SOLID—Single-responsibility Principle, Open-closed Principle, Liskov substitution principle, Interface segregation principle, Dependency Inversion principle

T 

 TAO—Track-At-Once
 TAPI—Telephony Application Programming Interface
 TASM—Turbo ASseMbler
 TB—TeraByte
 Tcl—Tool Command Language
 TCP—Transmission Control Protocol
 TCP/IP—Transmission Control Protocol/Internet Protocol
 TCU—Telecommunication Control Unit
 TDMA—Time-Division Multiple Access
 TFT—Thin-Film Transistor
 TFTP—Trivial File Transfer Protocol
 TI—Texas Instruments
 TIFF—Tagged Image File Format
 TLA—Three-Letter Acronym
 TLD—Top-Level Domain
 TLS—Thread-Local Storage
 TLS—Transport Layer Security
 TLV—Type—length—value
 tmp—temporary
 TNC—Terminal Node Controller
 TNC—Threaded Neill-Concelman connector
 TPF—Transaction Processing Facility
 TPM—Trusted Platform Module
 TROFF—Trace Off
 TRON—Trace On
 TRON—The Real-time Operating system Nucleus
 TRSDOS—Tandy Radio Shack - Disk Operating System
 TSO—Time Sharing Option
 TSP—Traveling Salesman Problem
 TSR—Terminate and Stay Resident
 TTA—True Tap Audio
 TTF—TrueType Font
 TTL—Transistor—Transistor Logic
 TTL—Time To Live
 TTS—Text-to-Speech
 TTY—Teletype
 TUCOWS—The Ultimate Collection of Winsock Software
 TUG—TeX Users Group
 TWAIN—Technology Without An Interesting Name

U 

 UAAG—User Agent Accessibility Guidelines
 UAC—User Account Control
 UART—Universal Asynchronous Receiver/Transmitter
 UAT—User Acceptance Testing
 UB—Undefined Behavior
 UCS—Universal Character Set
 UDDI—Universal Description, Discovery, and Integration
 UDMA—Ultra DMA
 UDP—User Datagram Protocol
 UEFI—Unified Extensible Firmware Interface
 UHF—Ultra High Frequency
 UI—User Interface
 UL—Upload
 ULA—Uncommitted Logic Array
 ULSI—Ultra Large Scale Integration
 UMA—Upper Memory Area
 UMB—Upper Memory Block
 UML—Unified Modeling Language
 UML—User-Mode Linux
 UMPC—Ultra-Mobile Personal Computer
 UMTS—Universal Mobile Telecommunications System 
 UNC—Universal Naming Convention
 UNIVAC—Universal Automatic Computer (By MKS)
 UPS—Uninterruptible Power Supply or Uninterrupted Power Supply
 URI—Uniform Resource Identifier
 URL—Uniform Resource Locator
 URN—Uniform Resource Name
 USB—Universal Serial Bus
 usr—User System Resources
 USR—U.S. Robotics
 UTC—Coordinated Universal Time
 UTF—Unicode Transformation Format
 UTP—Unshielded Twisted Pair
 UTRAN—Universal Terrestrial Radio Access Network
 UUCP—Unix to Unix Copy
 UUID—Universally Unique Identifier
 UUN—Universal User Name
 UVC—Universal Virtual Computer
 UWP—Universal Windows Platform
 UX—User Experience

V 

 var—variable
 VoLTE—Voice Over Long Term Evolution
 VAX—Virtual Address eXtension
 VCPI—Virtual Control Program Interface
 VB—Visual Basic
 VBA—Visual Basic for Applications
 VBS—Visual Basic Script
 VDI—Virtual Desktop Infrastructure
 VDU—Visual Display Unit
 VDM—Virtual DOS machine
 VDSL—Very High Bitrate Digital Subscriber Line
 VESA—Video Electronics Standards Association
 VFAT—Virtual FAT
 VHD—Virtual Hard Disk
 VFS—Virtual File System
 VG—Volume Group
 VGA—Video Graphics Array
 VHF—Very High Frequency
 VIRUS—Vital Information Resource Under Seize
 VLAN—Virtual Local Area Network
 VLSM—Variable Length Subnet Mask
 VLB—Vesa Local Bus
 VLF—Very Low Frequency
 VLIW—Very Long Instruction Word
 VLSI—Very-Large-Scale Integration
 VM—Virtual Machine
 VM—Virtual Memory
 VMM—Virtual Machine Monitor
 VNC—Virtual Network Computing
 VOD—Video On Demand
 VoIP—Voice over Internet Protocol
 VPN—Virtual Private Network
 VPS—Virtual Private Server
 VPU—Visual Processing Unit
 VR—Virtual Reality
 VRML—Virtual Reality Modeling Language
 VSAM—Virtual Storage Access Method
 VSAT—Very Small Aperture Terminal
 VT—Video Terminal
 VTL—Virtual Tape Library
 VTAM—Virtual Telecommunications Access Method
 VRAM—Video Random Access Memory

W 

 W3C—World Wide Web Consortium
 WWDC—Apple World Wide Developer Conference
 WAFS—Wide Area File Services
 WAI—Web Accessibility Initiative
 WAIS—Wide Area Information Server
 WAN—Wide Area Network
 WAP—Wireless Access Point
 WAP—Wireless Application Protocol
 WASM—Watcom ASseMbler
 WBEM—Web-Based Enterprise Management
 WCAG—Web Content Accessibility Guidelines
 WCF—Windows Communication Foundation
 WDM—Wavelength-Division Multiplexing
 WebDAV—WWW Distributed Authoring and Versioning
 WEP—Wired Equivalent Privacy
 WFI—Wait For Interrupt
 Wi-Fi—Wireless Fidelity
 WiMAX—Worldwide Interoperability for Microwave Access
 WinFS—Windows Future Storage
 WinRT—Windows RunTime
 WINS—Windows Internet Name Service
 WLAN—Wireless Local Area Network
 WMA—Windows Media Audio
 WMI—Windows Management Instrumentation 
 WMV—Windows Media Video
 WNS—Windows Push Notification Service
 WOL—Wake-on-LAN
 WOR—Wake-on-Ring
 WORA—Write once, run anywhere
 WORE—Write once, run everywhere
 WORM—Write Once Read Many
 WPA—Wi-Fi Protected Access
 WPAD—Web Proxy Autodiscovery Protocol
 WPAN—Wireless Personal Area Network
 WPF—Windows Presentation Foundation
 WS-D—Web Services-Discovery
 WSDL—Web Services Description Language
 WSFL—Web Services Flow Language
 WUSB—Wireless Universal Serial Bus
 WWAN—Wireless Wide Area Network
 WWID—World Wide Identifier
 WWN—World Wide Name
 WWW—World Wide Web
 WYSIWYG—What You See Is What You Get
 WZC—Wireless Zero Configuration

X 

 XAG—XML Accessibility Guidelines
 XAML—eXtensible Application Markup Language
 XDM—X Window Display Manager
 XDMCP—X Display Manager Control Protocol
 XCBL—XML Common Business Library
 XHTML—eXtensible Hypertext Markup Language
 XILP—X Interactive ListProc
 XML—eXtensible Markup Language
 XMMS—X Multimedia System
 XMPP—eXtensible Messaging and Presence Protocol
 XMS—Extended Memory Specification
 XNS—Xerox Network Systems
 XP—Cross-Platform
 XP—Extreme Programming
 XPCOM—Cross Platform Component Object Model
 XPI—XPInstall
 XPIDL—Cross-Platform IDL
 XPS—XML Paper Specification
 XSD—XML Schema Definition
 XSL—eXtensible Stylesheet Language
 XSL-FO—eXtensible Stylesheet Language Formatting Objects
 XSLT—eXtensible Stylesheet Language Transformations
 XSS—Cross-Site Scripting
 XTF—eXtensible Tag Framework
 XTF—eXtended Triton Format
 XUL—XML User Interface Language
 XVGA—Extended Video Graphics Adapter

Y 

 Y2K—Year Two Thousand
 Y2K38—Year Two Thousand Thirty Eight
 YAAF—Yet Another Application Framework
 YACC—Yet Another Compiler Compiler
 YAGNI—You Aren't Gonna Need It
 YAML—YAML Ain't Markup Language
 YARN—Yet Another Resource Negotiator
 YaST—Yet another Setup Tool

Z 

 ZCAV—Zone Constant Angular Velocity
 ZCS—Zero Code Suppression
 ZIF—Zero Insertion Force
 ZIFS—Zero Insertion Force Socket
 ZIP—ZIP file archive
 ZISC—Zero Instruction Set Computer
 ZOI—Zero One Infinity
 ZOPE—Z Object Publishing Environment
 ZMA—Zone Multicast Address
 ZPL—Z-level Programming Language

See also
 Acronym
 Internet slang
 List of file formats
 List of information technology initialisms
 Professional certification

References

External links 

 The UNIX Acronym List

Lists of abbreviations
Lists of computer terms
Computer jargon